Loyalty is a firm and consistent allegiance to and support of a person, group, or cause.

Loyalty may also refer to:

Places
Loyalty Building, in Portland, Oregon, on the U.S. National Register of Historic Places
Loyalty Islands, a part of the French territory of New Caledonia in the Pacific Ocean

Arts, entertainment, and media

Music

Albums
Loyalty (Fat Joe album), 2002
Loyalty (Screwball album), 2001
Loyalty (Soulja Boy album), 2015

Classical music
Loyalty, a 1970 song cycle for male acapella choir by Dmitri Shostakovich

Songs
 "Loyalty" (Birdman song), 2010
 "Loyalty" (Kendrick Lamar song), 2016
 "Loyalty", a song from Mardi Gras (1958 film), recorded by Pat Boone
 "Loyalty", a song from the 2017 album Polygondwanaland by King Gizzard and the Lizard Wizard
 "Loyalty", a song from the 2021 album 25 by G Herbo

Television
"Loyalty" (Angel), a 2002 episode of the TV series Angel
"Loyalty" (Law & Order: Criminal Intent), a 2010 episode of the TV series Law & Order: Criminal Intent
"Loyalty", an episode of the British sitcom Birds of a Feather

Other uses in arts, entertainment, and media
Loyalty (film), a 2003 British television film part of the Hornblower series
Loyalty (monument), a monument to a dog in the Russian city of Tolyatti

Ships
, several British Royal Navy warships
, several United States Navy warships

See also
Loyalties (disambiguation)
Loyalty program